Radical 146 or radical west meaning "" or "west" is one of the 29 Kangxi radicals (214 radicals in total) composed of 6 strokes.

In the Kangxi Dictionary, there are 29 characters (out of 49,030) to be found under this radical.

Evolution

Derived characters

Literature

See also

Unihan Database - U+897E

146
126